O.D.T. (O.D.T.: Escape... Or Die Trying in North America) is an action-adventure video game developed by FDI and published by Psygnosis for PlayStation and Microsoft Windows.

Characters
Captain Lamat: Protagonist of the story, despite being a non-playable character. Captain of the Nautiflyus, the ship which crash-lands in the forbidden zone.
Corporal Ike Hawkins: Second in command, with generally balanced abilities.
Cartographer Julia Chase: Generally balanced abilities, though one of the better magic users.
Chief Engineer Maxx Havok: High armor and weapon abilities, though a poor magic user.
Archbishop Solaar: The most powerful magic user, though has weak armour. Accompanied by a bird that occasionally attacks enemies or breakable objects.
Stowaway Sophia Hawkins: Unlockable character, with generally high and balanced abilities. Ike's sister.
Karma, the Ex-Deviant: Unlockable character, one of the enemy monsters in the game sympathetic to the heroes. Generally high and balanced abilities.
Mr Bodybolt, 7th Passenger: Unlockable character, exclusive to the unreleased N64 version. Very tough and good with fire ammo, but a poor magic user.

Development
Jean-Baptiste Bolcato told PSExtreme magazine that the core of the team was carried over from the development of Adidas Power Soccer, also published by Psygnosis for the PlayStation. He cited The Chaos Engine as a direction inspiration on the game, highlighting its "'futur-anterieur' look and feel a la Jules Verne"  as distinctive among the more common cyberpunk aesthetic found in games at the time.

Reception

The game received mixed reviews on both platforms according to the review aggregation website GameRankings. Next Generation said of the PlayStation version, "There are some neat things in the game such as the batwinged familiar that follows the mage around and the spellcasting interface, but in the end this game is a drag."

Notes

References

External links

1998 video games
Action-adventure games
Cancelled Nintendo 64 games
PlayStation (console) games
Psygnosis games
Steampunk video games
Windows games
Video games developed in France